Juan Ealo de la Herrán (October 22, 1912 – December 22, 1997) was a Cuban baseball player.

He played for the Cuban national baseball team in the 1942 Amateur World Series, hitting .375 and leading the tournament with four doubles, helping his team win Gold. In the 1944 Amateur World Series, he hit .206. He managed the Nicaragua team for part of the 1948 Amateur World Series before being fired and replaced by Nicaraguan dictator Anastasio Somoza García.

He was born in Camagüey, Cuba and died in Havana, Cuba.

References

1912 births
1997 deaths
Cuban baseball players
Sportspeople from Camagüey